Oakley is a city in Gove, Logan, and Thomas counties in the U.S. state of Kansas.  It is the county seat of Logan County.  As of the 2020 census, the population of the city was 2,046.

History
The area that would later become Oakley was settled in the 1870s and 1880s by travelers from the Smoky Hill Trail. Oakley was founded in 1884 by Judge Fredman and David D. Hoag. Originally named Carlyle, its name was changed to Cleveland, before settling on its final name of Oakley in 1885, named after Hoag's mother, Elizabeth Oakley Gardner Hoag.

Geography
Oakley is located at  (39.128023, -100.854490) at an elevation of 3,064 feet (934 m). It lies roughly 1 mile (1.6 km) south of the South Fork of the Saline River in the High Plains region of the Great Plains.

The city is located at the intersection of Interstate 70, U.S. Route 40, and U.S. Route 83 in northwest Kansas. It is in the northeast corner of Logan County, and portions of it extend into Gove County and Thomas County. Oakley is approximately 211 miles (340 km) northwest of Wichita, 227 miles east-southeast of Denver, and 335 miles (539 km) west of Kansas City.

Climate
The climate in this area is characterized by hot, humid summers and generally mild to cool winters.  According to the Köppen Climate Classification system, Oakley has a humid continental climate, abbreviated "Dfa" on climate maps.

Demographics

2010 census
As of the census of 2010, there were 2,045 people, 920 households, and 562 families residing in the city. The racial makeup of the city was 96.6% White, 0.4% African American, 0.6% Native American, 0.4% Asian, 0.7% from other races, and 1.4% from two or more races. Hispanic or Latino of any race were 2.8% of the population.

There were 920 households, of which 25.9% had children under the age of 18 living with them, 49.9% were married couples living together, 7.6% had a female householder with no husband present, 3.6% had a male householder with no wife present, and 38.9% were non-families. 35.0% of all households were made up of individuals, and 16.7% had someone living alone who was 65 years of age or older. The average household size was 2.18 and the average family size was 2.78.

The median age in the city was 44.8 years. 22.1% of residents were under the age of 18; 6.3% were between the ages of 18 and 24; 21.8% were from 25 to 44; 27.3% were from 45 to 64; and 22.6% were 65 years of age or older. The gender makeup of the city was 48.0% male and 52.0% female.

2000 census
As of the census of 2000, there were 2,173 people, 904 households, and 603 families residing in the city. The racial makeup of the city was 96.59% White, 0.55% African American, 0.14% Native American, 0.14% Asian, 0.46% from other races, and 2.12% from two or more races. Hispanic or Latino of any race were 1.24% of the population.

There were 904 households, out of which 27.5% had children under the age of 18 living with them, 56.4% were married couples living together, 7.1% had a female householder with no husband present, and 33.2% were non-families. 30.4% of all households were made up of individuals, and 15.9% had someone living alone who was 65 years of age or older. The average household size was 2.34 and the average family size was 2.94.

In the city, the population was spread out, with 24.3% under the age of 18, 7.0% from 18 to 24, 23.7% from 25 to 44, 22.2% from 45 to 64, and 22.8% who were 65 years of age or older. The median age was 42 years. For every 100 females, there were 88.6 males. For every 100 females age 18 and over, there were 88.1 males.

The median income for a household in the city was $30,781, and the median income for a family was $41,066. Males had a median income of $30,179 versus $19,886 for females. The per capita income for the city was $16,882. About 3.1% of families and 7.2% of the population were below the poverty line, including 7.1% of those under age 18 and 9.6% of those age 65 or over.

Museums

The Fick Fossil and History Museum is a museum that displays large dinosaur fossils from Kansas, many old tools, mineral specimens, and shell and mineral folk art.  The museum is free (donations) and open seven days a week in the summer, with shorter hours during the winter.

Education
The community is served by Oakley USD 274 public school district, which operates three schools in the city:
 Oakley Elementary School (Grades Pre-K-5)
 Oakley Middle School (6-8)
 Oakley High School (9-12)

There is also one Catholic school in Oakley, St. Joseph School (Pre-K-5).

The Oakley Plainsmen have won the following Kansas State High School championships:
 1974 Wrestling - Class 2-1A  
1970, 1971 Cross Country Boys - Class 2-1A
 1976 Boys Basketball - Class 2A 
 2005 Girls Cross Country - Class 2A
 2007 Girls Basketball - Class 2A
 1981, 1982, 1983, 1984, 1993 Volleyball - Class 3A 
 2000 Speech and Drama - Class 3A 
 1998 Two Speaker Debate - Class 3-2-1A

Media
Oakley has a weekly newspaper, The Oakley Graphic, the first edition of which was published on November 22, 1889.

Transportation

U.S. Route 40 runs east–west along the southern edge of the city. U.S. Route 83, which runs north–south, intersects U.S. 40 south of the city, runs concurrently with it for one mile going west, then turns north, running along the western edge of the city. East of the city, U.S. 40 merges with Interstate 70, which approaches from the northwest, and continues east.

Oakley Municipal Airport, located southeast of the city, hosts general aviation.

The Kansas Pacific (KP) Line of the Union Pacific Railroad runs east–west through town. A branch line splits off to the northwest toward Colby.

In popular culture
The 2006 CBS television series Jericho is about a fictional small town in northwest Kansas that must cope with the aftermath of nuclear attacks on major American cities. Oakley and Jericho also share the same intersection points of Interstate 70, U.S. Route 83, and U.S. Route 40.

References

Further reading

External links

City
 City of Oakley
 Oakley - Directory of Public Officials
Schools
 USD 274, local school system
Historical
 Fick Museum
 Historic Images - Wichita State University Libraries
Maps
 Oakley City Map, KDOT

Cities in Kansas
County seats in Kansas
Cities in Gove County, Kansas
Cities in Logan County, Kansas
Cities in Thomas County, Kansas
Populated places established in 1884
1884 establishments in Kansas